The N6 road is one of the national highways of Gabon. It connects the far south-west of the country at Mayumba to the centre at Lastoursville.  

Towns located along the highway include: 

Mayumba 
Tchibanga 
Ndendé 
Lébamba 
Koulamoutou 
Lastoursville 

National highways in Gabon